Barking Gecko Theatre is a Western Australian professional theatre company for children and families.
 
Established in Perth in 1989, Barking Gecko Theatre has put on over 100 original Western Australian productions, toured 12 countries and reached almost 1 million children. 

Barking Gecko Theatre is a resident company at the State Theatre Centre of WA, performing in the Heath Ledger Theatre and Studio Underground. It also performs in school classrooms, halls, site-specific non-theatre venues and outdoor locations. The company tours productions across Australia, and has also toured to Canada, the United States, Singapore, Japan, Hong Kong, Korea, Thailand, Indonesia and Mexico.

The company also delivers drama programs for children aged 4 to 18 across Perth, regional and remote WA.

Barking Gecko Theatre is a not-for-profit company governed by a Board of Directors. Receiving federal and state government arts funding, as well as corporate sponsorship and ticket revenue, the company has an annual turnover of more than $1.2 million and employs more than 60 primarily Western Australian artists each year.

Artistic Directors 
2015 – Present Matt Edgerton

2010 – 2014 John Sheedy

2006 – 2010 Jeremy Rice

1989 – 2006 Grahame Gavin

1985 – 1989 John Saunders (Acting Out)

Awards

2017 
Performing Arts WA Award Winner – Best Supporting Actor, St John Cowcher for My Robot

2016 
Helpmann Award Winner – Best Presentation for Children, Bambert's Book of Lost Stories

Helpmann Award Nomination – Best New Australian Work, Bambert's Book of Lost Stories

2015 
Helpmann Award Winner – Best Presentation for Children, The Rabbits

Helpmann Award Winner – Best New Australian Work, The Rabbits

Helpmann Award Winner – Best Costume Design, Gabriela Tylesova, The Rabbits

Helpmann Award Winner – Best Original Score, Kate Miller-Heidke with Iain Grandage, The Rabbits

Performing Arts WA Award Winner – Best Production, The Rabbits

Performing Arts WA Award Winner – Best Lighting, Trent Suidgeest, The Rabbits

References

1991 establishments in Australia
Theatre companies in Australia
Culture of Western Australia